Brane Benedik (born 22 June 1960) is a Slovenian ski jumper. He competed in the normal hill and large hill events at the 1980 Winter Olympics.

References

1960 births
Living people
Slovenian male ski jumpers
Olympic ski jumpers of Yugoslavia
Ski jumpers at the 1980 Winter Olympics
Sportspeople from Kranj